Allan G. Bense (born October 6, 1951) is an American businessman and politician. He served in the Florida State house from 1998 to 2006.  He serves as the chairman and chief executive officer of Bense Enterprises.

Biography

Early life
Allan Bense was born in Panama City, Florida on October 6, 1951, and the youngest child of Herbert and Bette Bense. Both of his parents died at the age of 45, he worked his way through Junior High School, High School, and College as a janitor, waiter, mechanic, salesman, and more. He began his business career deeply in debt after college. He received a Bachelor of Science in 1972 and a Master of Business Administration in 1974, both from Florida State University.

Career
He served in the Florida House of Representatives from 1998 through 2006. He was Speaker of the House from 2004 through 2006.  He is currently chairman of the Board of Bense Enterprises.  He serves on the board of directors of Capital City Bank Group ( CCBG: NASDAQ ).  He is a partner in several companies with interests in road building, mechanical contracting, healthcare, insurance, general contracting, golf courses, pavement marking, farming and others.
He is the immediate past chairman of the James Madison Institute, a Florida-based think tank; A member of the board of directors for Triumph Gulf Coast which is responsible for spending 1.5 billion in BP money in Northwest Florida; immediate past chairman of the board of trustees for Gulf Coast Regional Hospital (40 years).  He is the immediate past chairman of the Board of Florida State University, past chairman of the board of the Florida Chamber of Commerce; past chairman of the board of the Florida Taxation and Budget Reform Commission; past chairman of the board of the  Florida Council on Military Base and Mission Support; past vice chairman of Enterprise Florida ( the governor is the honorary chairman ); past chairman of the board of the Bay Economic Development Alliance;

He married his wife Tonie Johnson Bense in 1975, and they have three children: Courtney Weatherford, Jason Bense, and Taylor Bense. Tonie owns two dance studios, has 500 students, 13 instructors, and teaches 16 classes a week.  Courtney is a full-time mother of 4 and active in several volunteer groups in Wesley Chapel, Florida. Her husband, Will Weatherford is the immediate past Speaker of the Florida House of Representatives. Jason Bense is a partner with Allan Bense in a construction business, and Taylor Bense is a graduate of the Berklee College of Music in Boston, Massachusetts and is a musician in New York City.  In addition, Bense's older sister, Dr. Judith Bense, just recently retired as president of the University of West Florida, one of Florida's twelve public universities.

References

1951 births
Living people
Speakers of the Florida House of Representatives
Republican Party members of the Florida House of Representatives
Florida State University alumni
People from Panama City, Florida